I Shudder: And Other Reactions to Life, Death, and New Jersey is a 2009 collection of comedic essays written by Paul Rudnick.

Overview
Writer Paul Rudnick's collection of essays about being Jewish and gay in downtown Manhattan and suburban New Jersey, and his career as a Hollywood and Broadway script doctor and playwright.

Television pilot
The book was adapted into a 2016 television pilot written by Paul Rudnick and starring Megan Hilty, Hamish Linklater and John Behlmann.

References

External links

2009 non-fiction books
English-language books
Comedy books